Samuel Brinckerhoff "Brinck" Thorne (September 19, 1873 – June 3, 1930) was an American football player and coach.  He played college football at Yale University as halfback from 1893 to 1894.  As a senior and team captain in 1895, Thorn was named an All-American.  He returned to Yale in 1896 to serve as head football coach for a season, during which he guided the Bulldogs to a 13–1 record.  Thorne was inducted into the College Football Hall of Fame as a player in 1970.

Biography
Born in New York City, Thorne graduated from Yale University in 1896 and was a member of Skull and Bones.  He played for Yale for three years, was captain his senior year, and he was selected for the 1895 College Football All-America Team.  He studied mining engineering at Lafayette College and was in the mining business for many years.

Head coaching record

References

External links
 
 

1873 births
1930 deaths
19th-century players of American football
American football halfbacks
Yale Bulldogs football coaches
Yale Bulldogs football players
All-American college football players
College Football Hall of Fame inductees
American businesspeople in the coal industry
Lafayette College alumni
Players of American football from New York City